Taylor Small (born March 26, 1994) is an American politician. She is a member of the Vermont House of Representatives.

Early life
Small was born in Portland, Maine to Canadian parents. She lived in Johnson, Vermont, and then Western Massachusetts as a child. She returned to Vermont with her mother upon her parents' divorce and attended Colchester High School and Burlington Technical Center. She then went on to graduate from the University of Vermont in 2016 with a Bachelor of Science in Human Development and Family Studies with a minor in Sexuality and Gender Identity Studies.

Career
Small was elected to the Vermont House of Representatives in the 2020 general election after the incumbent Diana Gonzalez retired and is the state's first openly transgender legislator, and the fifth in the nation. She ran on both the Democratic ticket and Vermont Progressive Party ticket and won with 41% of the vote.

She is the Education Manager (and former Director of the Health and Wellness program) at Pride Center of Vermont and has worked with the Vermont Department of Health. Prior to that, she worked in mental health at Howard Center and Northwestern Counseling and Support Services and supported homeless and runaway youth with Spectrum Youth and Family Services. Through her drag persona, Nikki Champagne, along with her colleague, Emoji Nightmare, she has promoted local libraries and youth literacy and hosted fundraisers to help support Vermont’s non-profit organizations.

Small was named a 2022 Politician of Year by One Young World, receiving her award in Manchester, England in September 2022 alongside four other young politicians from around the world.

Personal life
Small lives in Winooski with her partner, Carsen, and their dogs, Theobroma and Charlie.

References

External links
Vermont General Assembly profile

Living people
1994 births
American drag queens
American people of Canadian descent
Candidates in the 2020 United States elections
LGBT state legislators in Vermont
Mental health activists
People from Johnson, Vermont
Transgender politicians
Transgender women
Transgender drag performers
University of Vermont alumni
Vermont Democrats
Vermont Progressive Party politicians